Serruria rosea, the rose spiderhead, is a flower-bearing shrub that belongs to the genus Serruria and forms part of the fynbos. The plant is native to the Western Cape, South Africa.

Description
Fire destroys the plant but the seeds survive. Two months after flowering, the fruit falls off and ants disperse the seeds. They store the seeds in their nests. The plant is bisexual. Pollination takes place through the action of insects.

Distribution and habitat
The plant only occurs in the Hottentots Holland Mountains from Slanghoek Mountains to Franschhoek.

References

rosea